Shooting at the 1998 Asian Games was held in Hua Mark Shooting Range, Bangkok, Thailand between 7 and 13 December 1998.

Medalists

Men

Women

Medal table

References

 ISSF Results Overview

External links
Asian Shooting Federation

 
1998 Asian Games events
1998
Asian Games
1998 Asian Games